FC Knyazha Shchaslyve was a Ukrainian football team based in the village of Shchaslyve (to the west of Boryspil), in the Kyiv Oblast of Ukraine, that competed in the professional leagues.

History
After the winter break before the resumption of competition in March 2009 the administration of FC Knyazha Schaslyve removed both the main club from the Ukrainian First League and its reserve team FC Knyazha-2 Schaslyve from the Ukrainian Second League.

The administration indicated that the club would not cease to exist but would restructure and function in some form, especially at the junior or youth levels.

It was founded in 2005. Knyazha won the Ukrainian Second League Group A championship in the 2007/08 season and were promoted to the Ukrainian First League. After the promotion of Knyazha to the Ukrainian First League, the club entered FC Knyazha-2 Schaslyve in the Ukrainian Second League which is to train up young players for the main team.

Sponsors
Kniazha, Dobromyl, Hyleys, and others.

Honors

Ukrainian Second League: 1
 2007/08 Champions Group A

League and cup history

FC Knyazha Shchaslyve 
{|class="wikitable"
|-bgcolor="#efefef"
! Season
! Div.
! Pos.
! Pl.
! W
! D
! L
! GS
! GA
! P
!Domestic Cup
!colspan=2|Europe
!Notes
|-
|align=center|2005–06
|align=center|3rd "A"
|align=center|12
|align=center|28
|align=center|6
|align=center|11
|align=center|11
|align=center|32
|align=center|35
|align=center|29
|align=center|1/64 finals
|align=center|
|align=center|
|align=center|
|-
|align=center|2006–07
|align=center|3rd "A"
|align=center|5
|align=center|28
|align=center|14
|align=center|9
|align=center|5
|align=center|34
|align=center|24
|align=center|51
|align=center|1/32 finals
|align=center|
|align=center|
|align=center|
|-
|align=center|2007–08
|align=center|3rd "A"
|align=center bgcolor=gold|1
|align=center|30
|align=center|24
|align=center|5
|align=center|1
|align=center|70
|align=center|13
|align=center|77
|align=center|1/16 finals
|align=center|
|align=center|
|align=center bgcolor=lightgreen|Promoted
|-
|align=center|2008–09
|align=center|2nd
|align=center|17
|align=center|32
|align=center|5
|align=center|5
|align=center|22
|align=center|22
|align=center|23
|align=center|20
|align=center|1/16 finals
|align=center|
|align=center|
|align=center bgcolor=pink|
|}

FC Knyazha-2 Shchaslyve 
{|class="wikitable"
|-bgcolor="#efefef"
! Season
! Div.
! Pos.
! Pl.
! W
! D
! L
! GS
! GA
! P
!Domestic Cup
!colspan=2|Europe
!Notes
|-
|align=center|2008–09
|align=center|3rd "A"
|align=center|17
|align=center|32
|align=center|4
|align=center|2
|align=center|26
|align=center|15
|align=center|35
|align=center|14
|align=center|
|align=center|
|align=center|
|align=center bgcolor=pink|
|}

Managers
 2005–2006 Viktor Ishchenko
 2006 Vitaliy Levchenko
 2007 Oleh Fedorchuk
 2007–2008 Stepan Matviyiv
 2008 Vitaliy Levchenko
 2008 Viktor Dohadailo
 2008–2009 Vitaliy Levchenko

References

External links
Official website 

 
Defunct football clubs in Ukraine
Boryspil Raion
Football clubs in Kyiv Oblast
2005 establishments in Ukraine
2009 disestablishments in Ukraine
Association football clubs established in 2005
Association football clubs disestablished in 2009